Cucujinus coquereli is a beetle species in the family Laemophloeidae found on Reunion Island off the coast of Madagascar. The scientific name of the species was first described by Grouvelle in 1899.

References

Laemophloeidae
Beetles described in 1899